The Eight ARMM Regional Legislative Assembly was a meeting of the unicameral regional legislature of the Autonomous Region in Muslim Mindanao.

Members

See also
Autonomous Region in Muslim Mindanao
ARMM Regional Legislative Assembly

References

ARMM Regional Legislative Assembly by legislative period